Sterling "Scoot" Henderson (born February 3, 2004) is an American professional basketball player for the NBA G League Ignite of the NBA G League. He played for Carlton J. Kell High School in his hometown of Marietta, Georgia, where he was a five-star recruit. At age 17, Henderson signed with the Ignite after graduating early from high school and became the youngest player in G League history. He is widely projected to be the second overall pick in the 2023 NBA draft.

Early life
Henderson was born in Marietta, Georgia to Chris and Crystal Henderson. His father is a coach and trainer, and his mother is a healthcare administrator. His parents run the training facility Next Play 360° in Marietta, where they moved from Hempstead, New York shortly before Henderson's birth. He is the second-youngest of seven siblings, including three sisters who played NCAA Division I basketball, and was nicknamed "Scoot" or "Scoota" because of how he would scoot across the floor as a baby. Henderson grew up training under the guidance of his father and played youth football before focusing on basketball in high school. He idolized Kobe Bryant, whom he emulated by waking up before 5 a.m. to train.

High school career
Henderson played basketball for Carlton J. Kell High School in Marietta. During his freshman season, he came off the bench and played alongside his brother, C. J., a senior on the team. In February 2020, during his sophomore season, Henderson scored a then career-high 49 points and made the game-winning shot in a 92–91 overtime win over Miller Grove High School in the first round of the Class 5A state tournament. He led Kell to the semifinals and averaged 24 points, six rebounds, three assists and three steals per game as a sophomore. Henderson was named Class 5A Player of the Year and first-team 5A All-State by The Atlanta Journal-Constitution. On January 22, 2021, as a junior, he scored 53 points in a 94–64 win against Osborne High School, breaking the program single-game and career scoring records. Henderson led Kell to the Class 6A state title game, scoring 29 points in a loss to Wheeler High School. He averaged 32 points, seven rebounds and six assists per game in the season, earning Class 6A Player of the Year and first-team 6A All-State honors from The Atlanta Journal-Constitution. He bypassed his senior season to play professionally.

Recruiting
Henderson was a consensus five-star recruit, and 247Sports ranked him as the second-best point guard in the 2021 class. He drew the attention of NCAA Division I programs at camps following his freshman year of high school. He received his first Division I scholarship offer from Ole Miss and held offers from Florida, Florida State and Georgia Tech by his sophomore season. On May 21, 2021, he announced that he would reclassify to the 2021 class and join the NBA G League Ignite, declining offers from Auburn and Georgia.

Professional career

NBA G League Ignite (2021–present) 
On May 21, 2021, Henderson signed a two-year, $1 million contract with the NBA G League Ignite, a developmental team affiliated with the NBA G League that was launched in the previous year. He was sidelined to start the season with a rib injury. On November 17, 2021, Henderson made his debut with eight points and six rebounds in a 115–103 win against the South Bay Lakers. At age 17, he became the youngest player in G League history. In his second game, on November 26, Henderson recorded a career-high 31 points, six rebounds and five assists in a 112–110 loss to the Santa Cruz Warriors. In February 2022, he was one of four Ignite players to compete in the Rising Stars Challenge at NBA All-Star Weekend, scoring two points for Team Payton in a 50–48 loss to Team Barry. In the 2021–22 season, he played 11 games in the G League Showcase Cup and 10 exhibition games and averaged 14.3 points, 4.8 rebounds and 4.2 assists per game.

In October 2022, Henderson represented the Ignite in a pair of exhibition games against Victor Wembanyama, the projected first overall pick, and Metropolitans 92. In the first game on October 4, he recorded 28 points, nine assists and five rebounds in a 122–115 win. On October 6, he left the second game after suffering a bone bruise in his right knee during the first quarter, as his team lost, 112–106. Henderson was named captain of Team Scoot for the G League's inaugural Next Up Game for the 2022–23 season.

Career statistics

NBA G League

|-
| style="text-align:left;"| 2021–22
| style="text-align:left;"| NBA G League
| 10 || 4 || 31.5 || .460 || .250 || .778 || 4.6 || 4.8 || 1.6 || .3 || 14.7
|- class="sortbottom"
| style="text-align:center;" colspan="2"| Career
| 10 || 4 || 31.5 || .460 || .250 || .778 || 4.6 || 4.8 || 1.6 || .3 || 14.7

Off the court
On June 15, 2022, Henderson signed a multiyear endorsement deal with Puma.

In 2022, Henderson applied for trademarks on his name and his motto, "Overly Determined to Dominate." In the same year, he launched his own boys' and girls' Amateur Athletic Union programs.

References

External links
USA Basketball bio

2004 births
Living people
American men's basketball players
Basketball players from Marietta, Georgia
NBA G League Ignite players
Point guards